Austin Stacks is a camogie club that won the All-Ireland Senior Club Camogie Championship in 1971 and 1972. The club won a further Leinster championship in  1973 and the Dublin Senior Championship on 11 occasions.

Background
The cub was formed in 1930 by Molly Heron, Violet Forde, Molly Tubbert, Rose Kelly, Rita Blake and the Fallon sisters.
Molly Fitzgerald-Murphy who trained Stacks teams for many years in Herbert Park, went on to become the Leinster Council and the Dublin County Board chair.

Other achievements
After capturing the Dublin league title from Celtic in 1965, they supplied half of the Dublin inter-county team that won the All Ireland championship, Mary Ryan, Mary Sherlock, Orla Ni Shiochain, Brigid Keenan and Anne McAllister.

All Ireland titles
Goals from Pauline Brennan, Anne Sheehy and Rita Halpin won their first All Ireland club championship in 1971.
In 1972 they were strengthened by the arrival of Liz Neary, who had already won three All-Ireland Club medals with St Paul's, and the return of Sligo-born Mary Sherlock, holder of five All-Ireland senior medals. They beat Portglenone by 4–2 to 2–0 in the final.

Players
Notable players included Bríd Reid, Liz Neary, (later to become a  Phyllis Campbell and All Ireland winning captain Doreen Rogers. Teresa Walsh (won the trophy for the best individual athlete from a full programme of 38 events at Dublin sports in 1963.

Colours
Austin Stacks wore a navy gym tunic with yellow and green bars around the skirt with a white blouse.

References

External links
 Camogie.ie Official Camogie Association Website
 Wikipedia List of Camogie clubs

Gaelic games clubs in Dublin (city)
Camogie clubs in County Dublin